Buron is a village in Calvados, France.

Buron may also refer to:

Surname

 Antoine Buron (born 1983), French footballer
 Jean-Louis Buron (1934–2005), French footballer, see France national football team results (1960–79)
 Martine Buron (born 1944), French politician, see Members of the European Parliament 1989–94
 Nicole de Buron (1929–2019), French writer
 Robert Buron (1910–1973), French politician

Given name

 Buron Fitts (1895–1973), Californian politician

Toponyms

 Büron, town in Switzerland
 Yronde-et-Buron, town in Auvergne, in France
 Burón, village in province of Castille and León in Spain

Other

 Buron (dwelling), temporary dwelling on the plateaux of Aubrac